Cocoa High School is high school located in Cocoa, Florida, and is part of the Brevard Public Schools District. The principal is Ms. Stewart .

History 

Cocoa High was constructed in 1917. It was a two-story reinforced concrete building on Willard Street, next to Forrest Park Complex. It contained grades 7-12. Seven years later, in 1925, a new three-story building was built on Forrest Avenue.

On September 2, 1952, Cocoa High School opened its new school building for grades 7-12 on Rockledge Avenue, the present site of Rockledge High. The building on Forrest Avenue became the Junior High for grades 7-8th grades. In 1959 grades 7-8 were moved to a middle school. The Forrest Avenue building was used by the then-new Brevard Jr. College, founded in 1959, for two years. In 1966 the school hired its first Black staff member Dr. Joe Lee Smith as Assistant Principal.

In 1970 a school was built at the present site on Rosetine Street (Tiger Trail). There were 18 separate buildings housing grades 9-12. The part of Rosetine Street bordering the Cocoa High campus was renamed "Tiger Trail" in honor of the school's mascot. In the 1974-75 school year, the School Board appointed its first woman to a high school principalship: Ruth Anderson to Cocoa High. In the 1978-79 school year the School Board appointed its first Black person to a Principalship: Richard "Dick" Blake to Cocoa High.

In 2010, the football team played three out-of-state games in an effort to be nationally ranked. In September 2010, the school was ranked 12th in the nation. It also set a county record for number of consecutive football victories: 31.

In October 2008, the football team lost a game to another Brevard County team. It would be another nine years before Rockledge High School beat Cocoa in the local BBQ Bowl District Champions football game in October 2017.

Campus
The school campus contains 25 single-story buildings located on Tiger Trail, in Cocoa, Florida.

 A 1,000-seat auditorium was built in 2010.

Sports

Cocoa High was the first High School in the County to win an FHSAA State Championship in any sport, winning the Class "A" State Boys Basketball Championship in 1960. The team finished #1 in the State and had a 29-1 record. The school was also the County's first High School to win a Girl's FHSAA State Championship in any sport winning the Class "AAA" Girls State Basketball Championship in 1978. Coach James Rowe's 2009 Boys Basketball Team won the school's second Basketball Championship winning the Class "AAA" Championship in 2009.

Its primary athletic rival is Rockledge High School.

Activities

The school offers students the following activities:

Student Government Association
Robotics
National Honor Society
Drama Club
Mu Alpha Theta
Guitar Club
J. Kyle Braid Leadership Club
Yearbook
Key Club
Best Buddies International
National Beta Club
Fellowship of Christian Athletes
Academic Team

Spanish Club
Future Business Leaders of America
Literary Magazine
Science Engineering Communications
Mathematics Enrichment
Music Organizations
Marching Band
Orchestra
Chorus
Gospel Choir
Science Research
JROTC

Florida Comprehensive Assessment Test (FCAT) controversy
At the end of the 2005-2006 school year, Brevard Public School District conducted an internal investigation of Cocoa High which resulted in the removal of four of the school's principals. The administration at the school inaccurately reported its FCAT information. The District found that the school's principal, and three assistant principals, were involved in the scandal. All four administrators were removed from their positions.

In 2007, the school scored a "D" based on the standardized testing for the year, the lowest score in the district. This was raised to an "A", using different criteria in 2010, after state officials decided the old standards were too high. It is one of five high schools in Brevard to have this grade.

Notable alumni

Bob Anderson (1956), All-State football, basketball, baseball, track; school, county first All-American in football. Two-time All-American at West Point; Heisman Trophy finalist twice. Professional football New York Giants.
 Emory L. Bennett (Class of 1948), Korean War Medal of Honor recipient.
Vassar Carlton (1932), 18 varsity letters for football, basketball, baseball; U-Fla. letterman in football, baseball. Retired as Chief Justice Florida Supreme Court.
Rodney Chester (Class of 1983), actor, dancer, choreographer
 Jamel Dean, Tampa Bay professional football player
 James Folston (Class of 1989), professional American football player. Was named to four All American teams as a College Senior. Associated Press, Football Gazette, NFL Draft Report and the Walter Camp Foundation. 1994-2nd Round Draft Pick of the Los Angeles Raiders.
 Chauncey Gardner-Johnson, professional football player, Philadelphia Eagles
 Javian Hawkins, University of Louisville and NFL running back
 Jesse Lee Kercheval (Class of 1974, graduated 1973), author, poet, and professor of English at the University of Wisconsin–Madison.
Scott Thompson alias Carrot Top (Class of 1983), comedian.
 Ronald Patrick (Class of 2009), professional American football player
 Chip Skowron, hedge fund portfolio manager convicted of insider trading
 Jawaan Taylor '2016, professional football player for Jacksonville Jaguars.

Footnotes 

Brevard Public Schools
Cocoa, Florida
Educational institutions established in 1917
High schools in Brevard County, Florida
Public high schools in Florida
1917 establishments in Florida